İsmail Zühdi Efendi ( Modern Turkish: Hattat İsmail Zühdü Efendi, also known as Yeni İsmail Zühdi) (d. 1806) was an Ottoman calligrapher. “Efendi” is a title of nobility, so this name can also be rendered İsmail Zühdi.

Life and career

İsmail Zühdi was born in Unye on the Black Sea. His father, Mehmed Kaptan, took him to Istanbul at a young age to learn the Qur'an. He is also known as Yeni İsmail Zühdi, or İsmail Zühdi the Second, to distinguish him from another calligrapher by the same name who lived in an earlier period.

İsmail Zühdi had a much younger brother, Mustafa Râkim, who also became a calligrapher. When Mustafa was still quite young, their father took the boy to Istanbul to live with İsmail and study calligraphy with him. By that time, İsmail had been appointed as an instructor of calligraphy at the Imperial Palace, which is where the young Mustafa Râkim received his formal training, studying under his brother.

İsmail Zühdi wrote in a firm and masterful way. The two brothers, İsmail Zühdi and Mustafa Râkim, went on to develop their own style of calligraphy based on the work of Hâfiz Osman. They were able to develop a style of celi sülüs that was aesthetically pleasing, something that other calligraphers had not been able to do. His younger brother, Mustafa Râkim, also perfected the tughra and went on to perfect other scripts, becoming İsmail Zühdi's most celebrated pupil.

Some forty Qur’ans copied by him have survived. He also left many writing boards, ki'tas and muraqqas. The inscriptions of the mausoleum of Châh-Sultane at the Deftèrdâr of Eyyoub are by him as is the inscription placed above the door of this same mausoleum is from Mouçtafa 'Izzèt Yasâri. He died in 1806 and was buried outside the gate of Adrianople, at the Edirnekapı Martyr's Cemetery. His brother Mustafa wrote his epitaph.  Mustafa postponed his major calligraphic innovations until İsmail died, in deference to seniority.

See also
Culture of the Ottoman Empire
Islamic calligraphy
List of Ottoman calligraphers
Ottoman art 
Thuluth

References

Ottoman culture
Calligraphers from the Ottoman Empire
1715 deaths
Year of birth unknown
17th-century artists from the Ottoman Empire
18th-century artists from the Ottoman Empire
18th-century calligraphers
17th-century calligraphers